The 2012 Texas Tech Red Raiders football team represented Texas Tech University as member of the Big 12 Conference during the 2012 NCAA Division I FBS football season. Led by Tommy Tuberville in his third and final season as head coach the Red Raiders compiled an overall record of 8–5 with a mark 4–5 conference play, placing in a four-way tie for fifth place in Big 12. Texas Tech was invited to the Meineke Car Care Bowl of Texas, where they defeated Minnesota. The team played home games at Jones AT&T Stadium on the university's campus in Lubbock, Texas. 

At the end of the regular season, Tuberville resigned to take the same position at Cincinnati. Offensive line coach Chris Thomsen served as interim head coach for the team's bowl game. Former Red Raider quarterback and Texas A&M offensive coordinator Kliff Kingsbury was hired as the new head coach for the 2013 season.

Preseason

Award watch lists
Seth Doege: Maxwell Award, Davey O'Brien Award, Johnny Unitas Golden Arm Award, Walter Camp Award, Manning Award
LaAdrian Waddle: Outland Trophy
Eric Ward: Biletnikoff Award

Coaching changes
Defensive Coordinator: Art Kaufman replaces Chad Glasgow
Defensive Line: Fred Tate replaces Sam McElroy
Offensive Line: Chris Thomsen replaces Matt Moore
Secondary: John Lovett replaces Otis Mounds

Schedule

Denotes the largest crowd to watch a football game at Jones AT&T Stadium, beating a previous record set earlier in the season in Oklahoma game.

Game summaries

Northwestern State
Sources:
 

The Red Raiders set a school record for total yards allowed in a game, with only 86 being given up to the Demons. Eric Stephens scored a pair of first-half touchdowns and Kenny Williams scored on pass from Seth Doege as the Raiders opened a 24–3 halftime lead. Doege left the game before the end of the third quarter, and his replacement, Michael Brewer, threw a pair of fourth-quarter touchdowns to Marcus Kennard as Texas Tech completed the season-opening rout.

Texas State
Sources:
 

Texas State came into the game after a dominating 30–13 upset over Houston, and with a capacity crowd in a newly renovated stadium in their first year in the NCAA FBS division.  But Texas Tech jumped out to a quick 14–0 lead less than 5 minutes into the game, and opened a 28–0 lead halfway through the second quarter.  Seth Doege threw for 319 yards and 5 touchdown passes before being pulled from action in the third quarter, and Texas Tech's defense held Texas State to just 270 total yards of offense. Cody Davis had an 88-yard interception return for a touchdown to lead Texas Tech's defense.

New Mexico
Sources:
 

The Texas Tech Red Raiders faced the New Mexico Lobos, under new head coach Bob Davie, on Texas Tech's Family Day at Jones AT&T Stadium.  Seth Doege threw for 340 yards and 6 touchdowns in a dominating performance for the Texas Tech offense in the first three quarters.  Doege tossed three touchdown passes to Eric Ward in the first half, and added touchdown passes to Jace Amaro and Darrin Moore before halftime. New Mexico got a second-quarter touchdown run and a long kickoff return for a touchdown to pull within 28–14 with 2:06 remaining in the second quarter, but Texas Tech pulled ahead to a 42–14 lead with two touchdowns in the final minute before halftime.  Doege threw another touchdown pass to tight end Jace Amaro on Texas Tech's first possession in the second half before going to the sidelines with 11 minutes left in the third quarter. Tech's defense held UNM to only 170 total yards and just 43 yards passing.

Iowa State
Sources:
 

Coming into the game, Texas Tech was ranked first in total defense, and second in total offense. The Red Raiders held the Cyclones to 189 yards of total offense. Senior cornerback Cornelius Douglas earned recognition as Big 12 Defensive Player of the Week after recording two interceptions.  Douglas is the first Red Raider defensive player to earn the honor since Daniel Charbonnet in 2008. Douglas was also named as the Jim Thorpe Defensive Back Of The Week.

Oklahoma
Sources:
 

Texas Tech came into the game with the nation's No. 1-ranked defense, but it was Oklahoma's defense that shut down Texas Tech's offense in the Raiders' first loss of the season. The game was played in cold, windy weather before a Jones AT&T Stadium record crowd of 60,800. Texas Tech held a 10–7 lead early in the second quarter on a 35-yard field goal by Ryan Bustin and a 7-yard touchdown run by Kenny Williams, but Oklahoma answered with a Blake Bell touchdown run to take a 14–10 lead.  The Sooners took a 24–13 halftime lead and outscored Texas Tech 17–0 in the third quarter, and the OU defense intercepted Seth Doege three times.

West Virginia

Starting quarterback Seth Doege threw for a career-high 504 yards, and tied his career high with 6 touchdown passes. The team was also named the Tostitos Fiesta Bowl National Team of the Week. Tech's defense gave up 275 yards to Heisman Trophy front-runner Geno Smith, but only one touchdown pass. Three of Doege's touchdown passes went to Darrin Moore, and Jace Amaro had 5 catches for 156 yards and one touchdown. Sadale Foster's 53-yard touchdown run shortly before halftime gave the Raiders a 35–7 halftime lead as Texas Tech won its Homecoming game. Doege earned Big 12 Offensive Player of the Week honors, as well as being named the Davey O'Brien Quarterback of the Week. Safety Cody Davis was named the Big 12 Defensive Player of the Week.  CBS Sports named Tuberville the Big XII "Coach of the Week" after the victory.

TCU

Quarterback Seth Doege threw for a new career high 7 touchdowns in the triple overtime victory and was named as a semi-finalist for the Davey O'Brien Award, won the Capital One Cup Impact Performance of the Week, and was named the AT&T All America Player of the Week. The game was the first in the history of either school to have three overtime periods, and the combined score was the highest in Texas Tech history since 1950.

Kansas State

Texas

Kansas

Texas Tech came into the Kansas game after consecutive losses to ranked teams (Texas and Kansas State). In the final home game for the 2012 seniors, Seth Doege threw for 476 yards and three touchdowns as the Red Raiders survived the upset bid from the Jayhawks. Doege threw his three touchdown passes to Jakeem Grant, Tyson Williams and Darrin Moore in the first half as Texas Tech built a 21–7 lead midway through the second quarter. Texas Tech had the ball and was in position to drive for another score, but a Doege interception gave the Jayhawks new life and they closed to within 21–17 at the half. Texas Tech's offense stalled in the red zone in the second half as they managed only a pair of field goals. Kansas tied the score on a field goal with 41 seconds remaining, but Doege and the Raiders responded, driving into field goal position in the closing seconds of the game. However, a 41-yard Ryan Bustin field goal attempt barely missed to the left as time ran out. In the first overtime, the Jayhawks scored on a screen pass from Michael Cummings to star running back James Sims, and the Raiders tied things up with senior Eric Stephens' touchdown run and Bustin's extra point. In the second overtime, the Raiders scored on a "wildcat" formation trick play, with Stephens throwing to Darrin Moore for the go-ahead touchdown.  Texas Tech's defense made a stand on Kansas' ensuing possession, shutting down three running attempts to set up a fourth down from the 24-yard line. Cummings' pass to the end zone was knocked down, and Texas Tech improved its record to 7–3 for the season.

Oklahoma State

Baylor

Minnesota

After the regular season, but prior to the 2012 Meineke Car Care Bowl of Texas, Tommy Tuberville left the program to take the head coaching job with the Cincinnati Bearcats. Kliff Kingsbury was hired as the new head coach. Nevertheless, Chris Thomsen, interim head coach, oversaw the bowl game.

Rankings

References

Texas Tech
Texas Tech Red Raiders football seasons
Texas Bowl champion seasons
Texas Tech Red Raiders football